This is a list of settlements in Phocis, Greece

A

 Agia Efthymia
 Agioi Pantes
 Agios Georgios
 Agios Konstantinos
 Alpochori
 Amfissa
 Amygdalia
 Ano Polydrosos
 Apostolias
 Artotina
 Athanasios Diakos
 Avoros

C
 Chrisso

D

 Dafnos
 Delphi
 Desfina
 Diakopi
 Dichori
 Doriko
 Drosato
 Drosochori

E

 Efpalio
 Elaia
 Elaionas
 Eptalofos
 Erateini

F
 Filothei

G

 Galaxidi
 Glyfada
 Gravia

I
 Itea

K

 Kalli
 Kallithea
 Kaloskopi
 Kampos
 Karoutes
 Kastellia
 Kastraki
 Kastriotissa
 Kerasies
 Kirra
 Klima
 Kokkino
 Koniakos
 Koupaki
 Kriatsi
 Krokyleio

L

 Lefkaditi
 Lidoriki
 Lilaia
 Livadi

M

 Makrini
 Malamata
 Malandrino
 Managouli
 Marathias
 Mariolata
 Mavrolithari
 Milea
 Monastiraki
 Mousounitsa

O
 Oinochori

P

 Palaioxari
 Panormos
 Panourgia
 Pentagioi
 Pentapoli
 Penteoria
 Perithiotissa
 Perivoli
 Polydrosos
 Potidaneia
 Prosilio
 Pyra
 Pyrgos

S

 Sernikaki
 Sergoula
 Sklithro
 Sotaina
 Stilia
 Stromi
 Sykia

T

 Teichio
 Tolofon
 Trikorfo
 Tristeno
 Tritaia
 Trizonia

V

 Vargiani
 Vounichora
 Vraila

Y
 Ypsilo Chori

Z
 Zorianos

By municipality

See also

List of towns and villages in Greece

 
Phokida